Broken Arts was a not-for-profit arts group based out of Oshawa, Ontario, Canada. The group was originally formed in July 2009 and hosted its final event in 2018. The organization relied on the dedication of volunteers and had a total of twenty-eight members as of September 11, 2014. Broken Arts specialized in organizing and running events that were all-ages. These events included concerts, craft fairs, public games, workshops, dance nights, art shows, open mics, and festivals



History

Name and objective
In 2009, the group was originally called The Broken Arts Collective, they came up with their name in reference to the need for different arts groups to be brought together in Oshawa. The main goal quickly evolved into supporting youth engagement and opportunity in arts culture; all-age events and venues are often hard to book in many cities including Oshawa and they were hoping to try to change that.
The Broken Arts outlook is reflective of cultural sociology and industry scholars such as Baker, Bennett, and Homan who think that creative space and place are important for the youth. These authors conclude that ″despite the appeal of information technology and the Internet (the latter having wide applications in contemporary music practices), the ′local′ remains an important site for forms of youth interaction of a more conventional face-to-face nature″ and that creating opportunities in these spaces deters feelings of ″exclusion from the city centre.″

A broken beginning
The three co-founding members were Harley R. Pageot, Mike Rosenplot, and Natalie Garcia who noticed a lack of creative and organized collaboration in the city of Oshawa in 2009. After six weeks of hosting free art jam sessions in a local downtown café, Pageot, the longest running member to date wanted to abandon the project, but was encouraged to keep trying. Still with the early name The Broken Arts Collective, the group wanted to try something new, a concert series titled Soundtracked. With the moderate success of Soundtracked Volume 1, the collective was motivated to host more events. Since the 'Broken' beginning, the group now known as Broken Arts has hosted more than fifty music concerts and over seventy-five other events.

In the community

Events
Broken Arts has had an influence on such events as Buskerfest (Oshawa Edition) as well as helping coordinate local musician busking for the City of Oshawa's Canada Day celebrations. Buskerfest, held down town Oshawa on June 24, 2010, hosted seventy acts featuring local musicians, dancers, painters, and more. Broken Arts started hosting a craft fair in 2010, the first being held in the Oshawa McLaughlin Public library auditorium featuring DIY vendors and having poetry readings. The group continues to accept nominations and conduct a large survey in which they poll results to determine the winners of Broken Arts Music Awards (BAMA) since 2010. Each year, after votes have been tallied, Broken Arts hosts an event to give out the tangible DIY-made awards to local artists, bands, venues, as well as music stores.

Broken Arts Fest
The Broken Arts fest is a free all-ages festival held in downtown Oshawa at Memorial Park. This is an event run and fund-raised entirely by volunteers and has been annual since the year 2011. In 2012, the group increased the number of bands that performed at the festival going from fifteen to twenty-three as well as coordinating with the forty-four vendors scattered throughout the park. The next year, 2013, showed an increase again with a total of thirty-five bands performing. Canadian indie magazine Broken Pencil stated that the Broken Arts festival is "bringing back the DIY vendor market place."  The all-day fourth annual festival in 2014 consisted of nineteen bands on two separate stages, showcased a free yoga session, an arts and crafts workshop station with the Living Room Community Art Studio, and a number of vendors.

Awards and acknowledgement
The Durham Tourism department of the Regional Municipality of Durham, has held an awards show since 2011 to acknowledge and encourage innovation and progress in the local creative community. This award ceremony is called Durham Art of Transition Creative Awards (DATCA) and has multiple nomination categories. Broken Arts as a collective was the winner of the Best Creative Collaboration DATCA award at The Robert McLaughlin Gallery in 2013. The Best Creative Collaboration award acknowledged the group for engaging the community in events that promote "co-operation between traditional businesses and independent artists, for mutual and community economic and cultural benefit."

CD Release
Co-founder Harley Pageot decided to branch off of Broken Arts and start a small record label based out of Oshawa, Ontario. The first album that his record label, Fallen Love Records, produced was a compilation album featuring original songs by bands and artists that had performed for Broken Arts over the years. On October 6, 2012, Fallen Love Records officially released Broken Arts Presents: Half Built Horizons.

Track listing
 "Maybe Baby" by Chris and Cassy - 3:00
 "The One" by Darling Meadow - 4:08
 "Stuck in a Snare" by Hairy Holler - 3:37
 "Jived at Dong Point!" by Home Movies - 3:03
 "Lock Me Up" by Avery Island - 4:04
 "Honestly" by Katrina James - 3:31
 "You Just Slept" by Viva Mars - 2:25
 "Stuck in a Revolving Door" by Persian Rugs - 3:04
 "Knock Knock, Who's There? Doctor! Doctor Who" by Watershed Hour - 5:10
 "Large Blank Space" by The Undrummer - 4:09
 "Lady With the Weary Eyes" by The Cane Toads - 3:12
 "When the Mountains are Trees" by Jesse Maranger - 4:18
 "Adore You" by Elephant Shoes - 3:06

Reception
In an interview conducted by blogger Sarah Crookall, Harley Pageot, of Broken Arts and Fallen Love Records, mentions that the title Half Built Horizons is a commentary on Oshawa, ″We're at a really interesting point in the arts and music scene in Oshawa, but we're not fully there yet. We're not at the level of a Guelph or a Hamilton yet, we're at the halfway point.″
Freelance writer and longtime Oshawa resident, William McGuirk wrote that the album was ″A gathering of hometown talents and local heroes on one disc. Called Half Built Horizons, it is a wonderful piece of work.″ Mcguirk concludes that the album is a tangible product that acts as representation of the hard work that Broken Arts has put toward building a better local music scene.

References

Non-profit organizations based in Ontario
Arts organizations based in Canada